The Shadow Cabinet of the 40th Legislative Assembly of British Columbia, constituting members of the opposition BC New Democratic Party, was announced by Opposition Leader Adrian Dix on June 14, 2013 following the general election.

List

See also
 Official Opposition Shadow Cabinet of the 38th Legislative Assembly of British Columbia
Cabinet of Canada
Official Opposition (Canada)
Shadow Cabinet
Official Opposition Shadow Cabinet (British Columbia)

References

External links
 List of critics on BC NDP website

Politics of British Columbia